Walerian Przeniczka (8 September 1923 – 28 April 2015) was a Polish patriot, survivor of Soviet deportation to Siberia, soldier in the Polish Armed Forces commanded by General Władysław Anders, co-founder of the Polish Centre in Leamington Spa.

Childhood 
Walerian Waclaw Przeniczka was one of three children of Jan Przeniczka and Maria Przeniczka, née Furman. He had two sisters, Pelagia and Sabina. In 1931, his father, a tax inspector, was transferred to Szczuczyn Nowogrodzki, in what is now the Belarus Republic, and the whole family moved there. His mother died in 1934. In Szczuczyn Przeniczka attended grammar school, planning to return to his home province and continue his studies at the Military Cadet School in Rawicz. The outbreak of war put an end to these plans. After the Soviet invasion of eastern Poland, his father was immediately arrested by Soviet NKVD Internal Security Forces and deported to Arkhangelsk. On 13 April 1940, Przeniczka and his sisters were also deported to northern Kazachstan, where they were settled on the collective farm at Krywoszczoki.

Military career 
In August 1941, after the signing of the Sikorski–Mayski agreement, Przeniczka was allowed to leave the collective farm and join the Polish Armed Forces, being organised in the Soviet Union by General Anders. On 28 November 1941, the 18-year-old arrived at Buzuluk.
After passing his medical, he was allocated to 4th Company, 17th Infantry Regiment, forming part of the 6th Lwow Infantry Division. The Division was stationed in the village of Totskoye. Housed in a tent, and despite temperatures of minus 40 degrees, Przeniczka began his military training. In January 1942 he was sent to Yakkabog in Uzbekistan for six months. In July he left the Soviet Union via the port of Krasnovodsk, arriving in Pahlevi in Iran. Moving through Kermanszach and Khanakin, he arrived at his destination of Quizil—Ribat in Iraq. While still in Iran, he had been reunited with his father, who was in the civilian camp in Teheran. In Quizil-Ribat, Przeniczka continued his military training, now based on the British model. He was allocated to a 3-inch mortar unit, attached to HQ Company of the 17th Fusiliers Battalion. After training on the shooting range in practical and tactical skills, he was sent for vehicle training. He completed a course in driving and maintaining military vehicles, and soon became an instructor himself. As well as training officers, he collected deliveries of vehicles for the army. In 1943, following another re-organization, the 6th Lwow Infantry Division was disbanded, and his own 17th Fusiliers Battalion were incorporated into the 5th Borderland Infantry Division. Przeniczka served with the 5th Division throughout the campaign, from Iraq, through Jordan, Palestine and Egypt to Italy. Believing he was working for an Allied victory and an independent post-war Poland, he fought on the rivers Volturno and Rapido. He also took part in the 5th Division's actions against the 'Gustav' and Hitler Line, of fortifications on the Sangro river and on the 'Gothic' line. He served at the battle of Monte Cassino, and the later battles at Senio near Ancona, at Bologna and in Lombardy. 
After the end of the war, Przeniczka's Division remained in Italy, where he continued his secondary education in Alessano, completing the lower level of the Bacalaureat, whilst at the same time, in May and June 1946, attending an M3 Battery artillery course with the 10th Wolyn Fusiliers Battalion.

Life in Britain 
In 1946 Przeniczka arrived in Britain with the 5th Division, and was sent to Malmesbury Camp, near Bristol. He decided to remain in Britain and enrolled for two years in the Polish Resettlement Corps. This was a temporary arrangement, after which he was allocated a permanent place to stay. After de-mobilisation in 1948, he began working in Warwick and later in Leamington Spa. In 1957 he married Bogumila Bozena Lapinska, with whom he had two children, Barbara and Edward. In 1961, together with a group of patriots, he founded the Polish Centre in Leamington Spa, an organisation serving all members of the local Polish community. At the inaugural AGM he was elected treasurer. The organisation gave generous financial assistance to the Polish Government in Exile, the Polish Cultural Centre (POSK) and the local Polish language school. For over fifty years Przeniczka was a permanent member, and from 1985 to 2015 he served as treasurer and chief accountant.

In 2000, corporal Walerian Przeniczka was promoted by the Polish President to second lieutenant in the Polish Army.

Honours 
Polish honours
 Cross for Valour (Krzyz Waleczny)- 1945
 Silver Order of Merit for community work in Leamington Spa – 1990
 Monte Cassino Cross- Nr19019
 5th Borderland Infantry Division Cross- 1979
 6th Lwow Division honour- 1943
 5th Borderland Infantry Division honour- 1946
 Veteran of the Struggle for Independence honour- 1965

British honours
 Star 1939–1945
 Italy Star
 Defence medal
 War Medal 1939–1945

References

External links 
 History of the II Polish Corps
 Polish Centre in Leamington Spa
 Polish Armour in the Polish Armed Forces in the West 1940–1947
  Anna Kubajak, Deportations of Poles to Siberia in World War II, Part 3: Deportations to Soviet Russia in 1940–41, Part 4: The Polish Army in the USSR 
 Walerian Przeniczka

1923 births
Polish emigrants to the United Kingdom
2015 deaths